Ivory Coast is one of Africa's major forces in the Africa Cup of Nations. Ivory Coast has won the 1992 tournament, Ivory Coast has been runner up of the tournament, losing the tournament in 2006 and 2012.

The 2015 tournament was the last tournament to date Ivory Coast has won.

References

External links
Africa Cup of Nations – Archives competitions – cafonline.com

 
Ivory Coast national football team